Carmen, officially the Municipality of Carmen (Surigaonon: Lungsod nan Carmen), is a 5th class municipality in the province of Surigao del Sur, Philippines. According to the 2020 census, it has a population of 11,720 people.

Located in Barangay Esperanza is the "Sua Cool Spring", developed for tourism with the accommodation to swim and party.

Geography

Barangays
Carmen is politically subdivided into 8 barangays.
Poblacion
Santa Cruz
Puyat
Antao
Cancavan
Esperanza
Hinapuyan
San Vicente

Demographics

Economy

References

External links
 Carmen Profile at PhilAtlas.com
   Carmen Profile at the DTI Cities and Municipalities Competitive Index
 [ Philippine Standard Geographic Code]
 Philippine Census Information
 Local Governance Performance Management System

Municipalities of Surigao del Sur